Fashion from 1910 to 1919 in the Western world was characterized by a rich and exotic opulence in the first half of the decade in contrast with the somber practicality of garments worn during the Great War.  Men's trousers were worn cuffed to ankle-length and creased.  Skirts rose from floor length to well above the ankle, women began to bob their hair, and the stage was set for the radical new fashions associated with the Jazz Age of the 1920s.

Women's fashion

Oriental Opulence

During the early years of the 1910s the fashionable silhouette became much more lithe, fluid and soft than in the 1900s. When the Ballets Russes performed Scheherazade in Paris in 1910, a mania for Orientalism ensued. The couturier Paul Poiret was one of the first designers to translate this vogue into the fashion world. Poiret's clients were at once transformed into harem girls in flowing pantaloons, turbans, and vivid colors and geishas in exotic kimono. The Art Deco movement began to emerge at this time and its influence was evident in the designs of many couturiers of the time. Simple felt hats, turbans, and clouds of tulle replaced the styles of headgear popular in the 1900s (decade). It is also notable that the first real fashion shows were organized during this period in time, by the first female couturier, Jeanne Paquin, who was also the second  Parisian couturier to open foreign branches in London, Buenos Aires, and Madrid.

Two of the most influential fashion designers of the time were Jacques Doucet and Mariano Fortuny. The French designer Jacques Doucet excelled in superimposing pastel colors and his elaborate gossamery dresses suggested the Impressionist shimmers of reflected light. His distinguished customers never lost a taste for his fluid lines and flimsy, diaphanous  materials. While obeying imperatives that left little to the imagination of the couturier, Doucet was nonetheless a designer of immense taste and discrimination, a role many have tried since, but rarely with Doucet's level of success.

The Venice-based designer Mariano Fortuny y Madrazo was a curious figure, with very few parallels in any age. For his dress designs he conceived a special pleating process and new dyeing techniques. He patented his process in Paris on 4 November 1910. He gave the name Delphos to his long clinging sheath dresses that undulated with color. The name Delphos came from the bronze statue of the Charioteer at Delphi. Each garment was made of a single piece of the finest silk, its unique color acquired by repeated immersions in dyes whose shades were suggestive of moonlight or of the watery reflections of the Venetian lagoon. Breton straw, Mexican cochineal, and indigo from the Far East were among the ingredients that Fortuny used. Among his many devotees were Eleonora Duse, Isadora Duncan, Cléo de Mérode, the Marchesa Casati, Émilienne d’Alençon, and Liane de Pougy.

Tunics and hobble skirts

The extravagances of the Parisian couturiers came in a variety of shapes, but the most popular silhouette throughout the decade was the tunic over a long underskirt.  Early in the period, waistlines were high (just below the bust), echoing the Empire or Directoire styles of the early 19th century.  Full, hip length "lampshade" tunics were worn over narrow, draped skirts.  By 1914, skirts were widest at the hips and very narrow at the ankle.  These hobble skirts made long strides impossible.

Waistlines were loose and softly defined.  They gradually dropped to near the natural waist by mid-decade, where they were to remain through the war years. Tunics became longer and underskirts fuller and shorter.  By 1916 women were  wearing calf-length dresses.

When the Paris fashion houses reopened after the war, styles for 1919 showed a lowered and even more undefined waist.

Suits and coats
The tailleur or tailored suit of matching jacket and skirt was worn in the city and for travel.  Jackets followed the lines of tunics, with raised, lightly defined waists.  Fashionable women of means wore striking hats and fur stole or scarves with their tailleurs, and carried huge matching muffs.

Most coats were cocoon or kimono shaped, wide through the shoulders and narrower at the hem.  Fur coats were popular.

World War I
Changed dresses during World War I were dictated more by necessity than by fashion. As more and more women entered the workforce, they demanded clothes that were better suited to their new activities; these derived from the shirtwaists and tailored suits.  Social events were postponed in favor of more pressing engagements and the need to mourn the increasing numbers of dead, visits to the wounded, and the general gravity of the time meant that darker colors and simpler cuts became the norm. A new monochrome look emerged that was unfamiliar to young women in comfortable circumstances. Women dropped the cumbersome underskirts from their tunic-and-skirt ensembles, simplifying dress and shortening skirts in one step. By 1915, the Gazette du Bon Ton was showing full skirts with hemlines at calf length.  These were called the "war crinoline" by the fashion press, who promoted the style as "patriotic" and "practical".

Furthermore, people were dressing less extravagantly due to funds being put toward the war effort. According to Eileen Collard, Coco Chanel took notice of this and introduced costume jewelry. She replaced expensive necklaces with glass or crystal beads. "Without grading them to size, she mixed pearls with other beads to fashion original jewelry to be worn with her designs" that were inspired by women joining the workforce.

Footwear
Shoes had high, slightly curved heels.  Shorter skirts put an emphasis on stockings, and gaiters were worn with streetwear in winter.  "Tango shoes" inspired by the dance craze had criss-crossing straps at the ankles that peeked out from draped and wrapped evening skirts.

During the war years, working women wore sensible laced shoes with round toes and lower wedge heels.

Hairstyles and hats
Large hats with wide brims and broad hats with face-shadowing brims were the height of fashion in the early years of the decade, gradually shrinking to smaller hats with flat brims. Bobbed or short hair was introduced to Paris fashion in 1909 and spread to avant-garde circles in England during the war. Dancer, silent film actress and fashion trendsetter Irene Castle helped spread the fashion for short hairstyles in America.  Hair, even short hair, was frequently supplemented with postiches, small individual wigs, curls, or false buns which were incorporated into the hairstyle.

The Corset
As women began to become more active with dance and sport, they started to remove their corsets at parties in order to move more freely. In response corset manufacturers marketed the dance corset, which was less constricting, lighter, and more flexible. This shift made it a necessity to own more corsets because they served different functions. At the same time women now had more agency to decide their own shapes with the variety of corsets available.

Style gallery 1910–1912

Women playing hockey, Toronto, c. 1910
Large feathered hat of 1910
Postcard showing a hobble skirt, c. 1911
Fashion poster with 1911 hats
Gown by Jeanne Paquin from La Gazette du Bon Ton 1912
Parisian Dinner Dress owned by Ellen Roosval von Hallwyl ca 1912
Grand Duchess Tatiana of Russia wearing a large hat with a wide brim, 1912	
Coat of sable illustrated in Journal des Dames et des Modes, 1912
Victoria Ocampo, an Argentine writer, with short hair

Style gallery 1913–14

Three ladies vacationing in Mar del Plata, January 1913
Cover of Fashion Catalogue for Nordiska Kompaniet, 1913–14
Dinner dress for winter 1913–14 illustrating a dress by Jacques Doucet
Large hats remained the focus of daytime fashion to mid decade, 1914
Costume d'excursion or traveling costume of 1914 illustrates the tailored style that would replace opulence in the war years
Fur muffs and stoles were important fashion accessories in this period.
 Men's-style cravats were sometimes worn by women in 1914.
 Woman in 1914 wearing a belted, sailor-collared tunic with a tie.
Dancer Irene Castle was an early adopter of bobbed hair, 1914

Style gallery (mid-to late 1910s) 1915–16

Grand Duchess Maria Nikolaevna of Russia wears a kimono-style dressing gown in 1915. Oriental styles were in fashion during the decade.
"War crinolines" by (left to right) Paquin, Lanvin, Georges Doeuillet, and Paquin, La Gazette du Bon Ton 1915.
Portrait of Gladys Hulette wearing the latest fashion of July 1915
High-waisted dinner dress by Callot Soeurs, 1915
French fashions from c. 1915–16 still feature raised waists, but skirts are fuller and hats are smaller than in the early years of the decade
Illustration from McCall's c. 1916 shows natural waistlines and full, shorter skirts
Garment workers in a May Day parade of 1916, New York.
Women buying flowers at the market in 1915 in Cracow, Poland (Autochrome Lumière photo).

Style gallery 1917–1919

Fortuny tea gown worn by Mrs. Condé Nast, published 1917
Irene Castle wears a summer costume of 1916 or 17.  The tiered skirt foreshadows the shorter skirts that would arise in the early 1920s.
Portrait of 1917 shows the deep V-neckline that was popular after 1913, worn over a camisole.
Winter shoe, 1917
Draped turban, 1917
Toque of 1917 New York design
Elzee hat by Levis-Zukoski Mercantile Co of Missouri
Hat by D. B. Fisk & Co. of Chicago, 1917
1910s fashion drew inspiration from "exotic" countries including Spain and China.
1917 hat by Sinclair, Rooney & Co. of Buffalo, New York
Fall 1918
San Francisco society women wearing face masks during the "Spanish Influenza" pandemic, October 1918.
Cartoon depicting holiday shoppers during the 1918 flu pandemic.
Post-war summer afternoon dresses show the barrel shape and lowered waists that would characterize the styles of the early 1920s. Vogue, late June 1919.
In 1919, hemlines had begun to rise as can be seen in this photograph of a young woman.
Advertisement for fur coats from Eaton's Department Store, 1919
Day walking suit worn in 1919. The jacket is loose, belted, with fur-trimmed sleeves and lappets.
Argentine fashion illustration presenting "the latest models", 1919

Men's fashion

In general, styles were unchanged from the previous decade. Hair was generally worn short.  Wide moustaches were often curled. A decline in wearing facial hair, a trend which had begun around the beginning of the century, continued throughout the decade as more clean shaven styles appear.

Coats, waistcoats, and trousers
The sack coat or lounge coat continued to replace the frock coat for most informal and semi-formal occasions.  Three-piece suits consisting of a sack coat with matching waistcoat (U.S. vest) and trousers were worn, as were matching coat and waistcoat with contrasting trousers, or matching coat and trousers with contrasting waistcoat.  Trousers were ankle length with turn-ups or cuffs, and were creased front and back using a trouser press.  The gap between the shorter trousers and the shoes was filled with short gaiters or spats.

Waistcoats fastened lower on the chest, and were collarless.

The blazer, a navy blue or brightly colored or striped flannel coat cut like a sack coat with patch pockets and brass buttons, was worn for sports, sailing, and other casual activities.

The Norfolk jacket remained fashionable for shooting and rugged outdoor pursuits. It was made of sturdy tweed or similar fabric and featured paired box pleats over the chest and back, with a fabric belt.  Worn with matching breeches or (U.S. knickerbockers), it became the Norfolk suit, suitable for bicycling or golf with knee-length stockings and low shoes, or for hunting with sturdy boots or shoes with leather gaiters.

The cutaway morning coat was still worn for formal day occasions in Europe and major cities elsewhere, with striped trousers.

The most formal evening dress remained a dark tail coat and trousers with a dark or light waistcoat.  Evening wear was worn with a white bow tie and a shirt with a winged collar.  The less formal dinner jacket or tuxedo, which featured a shawl collar with silk or satin facings, now generally had a single button. Dinner jackets, worn with a white shirt and a dark tie, were gaining acceptance outside of the home.

Knee-length topcoats and calf-length overcoats were worn in winter.  Fur coats were worn in the coldest climates.

Shirts and neckties
Formal dress shirt collars were turned over or pressed into "wings".  Collars were overall very tall and stiffened, with rounded corners.
The usual necktie was a narrow four-in-hand.  Ascot ties were worn with formal day dress and white bow ties with evening wear.

Accessories
Silk top hats remained a requirement for upper class formal wear; soft felt Homburgs or stiff bowler hats were worn with lounge or sack suits. Flat straw boaters and fedora hats were acceptable for a wider range of activities than previously, and Panama hats were worn for travel. Gentlemen of all classes, especially the middle and working class often wore the newsboy cap and flat cap.

Style gallery

Portrait of Bernhard Koehler shows a tall shirt collar worn with a wide tie, 1910
A man's suit - summer, 1911
Formal daywear includes wing-collared shirt, three-piece suit with wide lapels and pressed trousers, Germany, 1912
Portrait of Ludwik Żeleński wearing a three-piece suit with characteristic collarless vest or waistcoat.  His shirt has a tall, stuff collar. Poland, 1912
Advertisement for men's sack suits, United States, 1912
Men's shoe fashion - summer, 1913
Fashion plate of 1914 show's man's overcoat worn with a Homburg hat and gaiters or spats.  Note ankle-length creased or pressed trousers with cuffs.
Portrait of Wallace Beery shows stiff collared shirt, striped necktie, and two-piece suit popular in mid-decade, c. 1914
Photo from a newspaper titled "sea side fashion for men" - 1915
A man and his dog in the summer of 1916
Men's winter overcoat from 1917
Spring suit fashions in 1918
Members of the Louisiana Five jazz band wear three-piece suits, 1919.  Courtesy of Nunez family collection.
Photo of The Prince of Wales in a three-piece suit with pleated, cuffed trousers, Homburg hat, 1919.
Men's clothing. Visual dictionary illustrations from a Swedish-German dictionary,1919.

Working clothes

Polish workers wear colored shirts with soft collars. The Strike, 1910
Raceway workers wear tall boots, breeches, and cloth caps.  The second man from the left is wearing a Norfolk jacket, Long Island, New York, 1910.
Aviator Calbraith Perry Rodgers, 1911, in a casual wool cap.
Irish immigrant in Detroit, Michigan, wearing a jacket, woollen sweater, and cap, 1912.
The "formal" clothes worn by stewards, waiters, butlers and others "in service" included a black (not white) tie.

Children's wear
Fashion for children in the 1910s evolved in two different directions, day-to-day and formal dress.  Boys were dressed in suits with trousers that extended to the knee and girls' apparel began to become less "adult" as skirt lengths were shortened and features became more child-focused (Villa 28).  The war affected the trends in general, as well (Villa 36).  Military influences in apparel for little boys was typical and the lengths of skirts for girls were cut shorter yet because of material rationing (Villa 37). The boys even wore shorts in the winter.

See also
Clothing in the Ragtime Era

Notes

References
Arnold, Janet: Patterns of Fashion 2: Englishwomen's Dresses and Their Construction c. 1860–1940, Wace 1966, Macmillan 1972. Revised metric edition, Drama Books 1977. 
Ashelford, Jane: The Art of Dress: Clothing and Society 1500–1914, Abrams, 1996. 
Black, J. Anderson, and Madge Garland, A History of Fashion, New York, Morrow, 1975

Laver, James: The Concise History of Costume and Fashion, Abrams, 1979.
Nunn, Joan: Fashion in Costume, 1200–2000, 2nd edition, A & C Black (Publishers) Ltd; Chicago: New Amsterdam Books, 2000.  (Excerpts online at The Victorian Web)
Osma, Guillermo de:  Mariano Fortuny: His Life and Work. New York:  Rizzoli International Publications, 1980.
Steele, Valerie: Paris Fashion: A Cultural History, Oxford University Press, 1988, 
Steele, Valerie: The Corset, Yale University Press, 2001
Villa, Nora. Children in Their Party Dress. Modena: Zanfi Editori, 1989. 28–37.

External links

1910s Fashion Plates of men, women, and children's fashion from The Metropolitan Museum of Art Libraries
Ladies' and Men's Evening Dress for the Ragtime Era 1910–1920 (vintage images)
 

1910s fashion
1910s decade overviews